The Zapatera Archipelago is located in Lake Nicaragua, Nicaragua. It consists of the  Zapatera Island (Isla Zapatera), Isla el Muerto and several other islets. The Zapatera Archipelago National Park is located there.

References

Lake islands of Nicaragua

Protected areas of Nicaragua